"Feels Like I'm in Love" is a song written and recorded by Ray Dorset with his band Mungo Jerry. It was a number-one hit on the UK Singles Chart for two weeks in September 1980 for Scottish singer Kelly Marie.

Original version
Written by Ray Dorset of Mungo Jerry, the song was originally written for and recorded by Elvis Presley but he died before it was released. Dorset's group recorded the song but their version was relegated to the B-side of a Belgian single "Sur Le Pont D'Avignon" (A-side). It was also featured on the band's album "In the Summer Time". The band later released several variations and remixes of the song.

Kelly Marie version

In 1979, Kelly Marie recorded the song for Pye Records. The song was a sleeper hit on the Scottish club scene before breaking through nationally in the summer of 1980, reaching the top of the UK Singles Chart in September. The song sold 760,000 copies in United Kingdom in 1980 alone. The following year, aided by a number of remixes the song became a club hit in the United States, reaching number ten on the Billboard Hot Dance Club Play chart.

Re-released on the Calibre record label with a new B-side "New York at Night", it followed a rare breed of record labels who gained a chart-topping success after their debut release. It was then re-released again in 1990 as a remix that was done by PWL.

Composition
The song is performed in the key of C major with a tempo of 121 beats per minute.

Charts

Weekly charts

Year-end charts

Cover versions
 Australian dance group Raffles released a cover version of "Feels Like I'm in Love" in November 1994, which peaked at number 66 on the Australian singles chart in early 1995.

Appearances in other media

The song featured in the 2002 romantic comedy-drama Once Upon a Time in the Midlands. It also appeared in the 2005 comedy-romance film,  Imagine Me & You, in the Dance Dance Revolution sequence. It was also featured in the Channel 4 series It's a Sin in 2021.

References

Kelly Marie songs
1977 songs
1979 singles
1980 singles
Songs written by Ray Dorset
UK Singles Chart number-one singles